Straža na Gori is a dispersed settlement in the hills north of Dramlje in the Municipality of Šentjur, eastern Slovenia. The settlement, and the entire municipality, are included in the Savinja Statistical Region, which is in the Slovenian portion of the historical Duchy of Styria.

Name
The name of the settlement was changed from Straža to Straža na Gori in 1953.

References

External links
Straža na Gori at Geopedia

Populated places in the Municipality of Šentjur